The 2012 Sun Life Financial Players' Championship was held from April 17 to 22 at the Consolidated Credit Union Place in Summerside, Prince Edward Island. It was the last Grand Slam event of the 2011–12 curling season and the twentieth time the tournament has been held. The purse is CAD$100,000 for both the men's and women's tournaments, and the winner of each tournament will receive CAD$18,000.

The Players' Championship was televised on Global Television Network across Canada, since CBC Sports had dropped its broadcast of Grand Slams prior to The National.

Men

Teams
The teams are listed as follows:

Round-robin standings

Round-robin results
All times listed in Atlantic Daylight Time (UTC−03).

Draw 3
Wednesday, April 18, 12:00 pm

Draw 4
Wednesday, April 18, 4:00 pm

Draw 5
Wednesday, April 18, 7:30 pm

Draw 7
Thursday, April 19, 12:00 pm

Draw 9
Thursday, April 19, 7:30 pm

Draw 10
Friday, April 20, 8:30 am

Draw 12
Friday, April 20, 3:30 pm

Draw 13
Friday, April 20, 7:30 pm

Playoffs

Semifinals
Saturday, April 21, 7:30 pm

Final
Sunday, April 22, 1:00 pm

Women

Teams
The teams are listed as follows:

Round-robin standings

Round-robin results
All times listed in Atlantic Daylight Time (UTC−03).

Draw 1
Tuesday, April 17, 7:00 pm

Draw 2
Wednesday, April 18, 8:30 am

Draw 3
Wednesday, April 18, 12:00 pm

Draw 4
Wednesday, April 18, 4:00 pm

Draw 5
Wednesday, April 18, 7:30 pm

Draw 6
Thursday, April 19, 8:30 am

Draw 8
Thursday, April 19, 4:00 pm

Draw 9
Thursday, April 19, 7:30 pm

Draw 11
Friday, April 20, 12:00 pm

Tiebreaker
Friday, April 20, 7:30 pm

Playoffs

Semifinals
Saturday, April 21, 8:30 am

Final
Saturday, April 21, 1:00 pm

Notes

References

External links
Event Home Page

Players Championship
Sport in Summerside, Prince Edward Island
Curling competitions in Prince Edward Island
Players' Championship
2012 in Prince Edward Island